Mike Walker (11 March 1930 – 30 November 2014) was a Scotland international rugby union footballer, who played as a lock.

Rugby union career

Amateur career

Walker played for Oxford University.

International career

He was capped for  once in 1952,  the cap coming in the Five Nations match against France.

References

1930 births
2014 deaths
Scottish rugby union players
Scotland international rugby union players
Oxford University RFC players
Rugby union locks
Rugby union players from London